Oksana Pavlovna Udmurtova (born 1 February 1982) is a Russian track and field athlete specialising in the long jump. She is from the Volgograd region of Russia and she is part of the Russian Army Athletics Club where she is coached by Viacheslav Dogonkin and Yu Malkov. She recently had success at the 2006 European Athletics Championships where she took the bronze medal. 

She first competed on the world stage at the 2005 World Championships in Athletics, when she finished sixth. For the 2006 season she placed 95 in the IAAF World Rankings.

International competitions

Personal bests

See also
List of European Athletics Championships medalists (women)

References

 
 Russian Athletics Profile of Oksana Udmurtova

1982 births
Living people
Russian female long jumpers
Olympic female long jumpers
Olympic athletes of Russia
Athletes (track and field) at the 2008 Summer Olympics
World Athletics Championships athletes for Russia
European Athletics Championships medalists
Russian Athletics Championships winners
Sportspeople from Volgograd Oblast